Ralph Gore may refer to:

Sir Ralph Gore, 2nd Baronet (died c. 1651), Irish MP for Donegal County 1639–1648
Sir Ralph Gore, 4th Baronet (died 1733), Speaker of the Irish House of Commons, MP for Donegal Borough, Donegal County 1713–1727 and Clogher
Ralph Gore, 1st Earl of Ross (1725–1802), his son, Irish general and MP for Donegal County 1747–1764
Ralph Gore (Irish politician) (c. 1724–1778), Irish MP for Kilkenny City (Parliament of Ireland constituency)